NASCAR 2000 is a racing simulator video game developed and published by EA Sports and co-developed by Stormfront Studios.

Publication history
The game was released in 1999 for Nintendo 64 and PlayStation and in 2000 for Microsoft Windows and Game Boy Color. The game is based on the 1999 NASCAR Winston Cup Series, with Adam Petty's 1999 Busch Series car and several legends such as Richard Petty and Alan Kulwicki also included. The game, along with NASCAR 98, is regarded as one of the best of EA Sports NASCAR series of video games. It was the last game for PC until NASCAR Thunder 2003. This game was the fourth title of the series.

The Windows version of the game includes manufacturer branding on the cars.

Reception

The PlayStation and PC versions received above-average reviews, while the Nintendo 64 and Game Boy Color versions received below-average reviews, according to the review aggregation website GameRankings. However, Doug Trueman of NextGen said that the PlayStation version "would have been a terrific title several years ago, but now it looks and sounds incredibly dated."

Michael Lafferty of GameZone gave the PC version nine out of ten, calling it "an adrenaline rush." However, Ash of GamePro said that the Nintendo 64 version "has a lot going for it, but it just couldn't close out the race."

Notes

References

External links
 
 

1999 video games
EA Sports games
Electronic Arts games
Game Boy Color games
NASCAR video games
Nintendo 64 games
PlayStation (console) games
Windows games
Simulation video games
Stormfront Studios games
Multiplayer and single-player video games
Video games developed in the United States